The Comedy & Magic Club is located in Hermosa Beach, California. The club's beachside location has made it a favorite destination for both comedians and audience members for a long time. Many of the top comics in the industry have referred to it as their home club. Gabriel Iglesias, Ian Bagg, Cristela Alonzo, Daniel Tosh, Arsenio Hall, and Jay Leno appear regularly. Leno has held a weekly residency on most Sunday evenings for many years. 

Their audiences are held in high regard by the comedians which frequent the venue as being some of the best in the country. It is a common practice for comedians preparing for a five-minute late night appearance to perform and polish their routines at the club. In addition to the roster of top-tier comedic talent TCMC boasts an impressive array of magic and variety performers including Derek Hughes, Rob Zabrecky, The Passing Zone, Danny Cole, Jon Armstrong, and Lindsay Benner. The club's interior is also a museum housing comedy memorabilia from Charlie Chaplin, Lucille Ball, Robin Williams, Jerry Seinfeld, Ray Romano, and others which is on display. The club is open from Tuesday through Sunday and also prides itself on being a fundraising force in the local community.

References

edition.cnn.com/2014/10/27/travel/la-comedy-clubs/

dailybreeze.com/general-news/20100308/lacey-quit-his-day-job-to-start-comedy-magic-club

davestravelcorner.com/guides/losangeles/los-angeles-ca-comedy-clubs/

External links
Official Website

Comedy clubs in California
Hermosa Beach, California
Nightclubs in Los Angeles County, California
Event venues established in 1978
1978 establishments in California
Magic clubs